The European Eventing Championships, like most other European Championships, is held every two years. Today it is a four star eventing competition. A four star event is one step down from the grand slam which consists of three five star events.

The first Championships were held at Badminton in 1953, where six teams (Britain, France, Ireland, Netherlands, Sweden and Switzerland) were sent, although only Britain and Switzerland were able to get their horses fit in time to actually compete. However, 10 teams were able to compete at the 1959 competition.

The 1995 and 1997 European Championships were held as part of events open to non-European riders (in Pratoni del Vivaro, Italy in 1995 and Burghley, England in 1997) with the top three European individuals and teams receiving medals. The first woman to win the competition was Shelia Wilcox in 1957, although women were not allowed to compete in the Olympics in eventing until 1964.

There is also a Championship held for young riders, juniors and ponies.

Format
The Championships offers both team and individual gold, silver, and bronze medals.

Each nation may bring a team of four riders and two individuals. The team riders also compete for the individual gold, silver, and bronze medals. The host nation may bring up to eight individual riders, with a total squad of 12.

The best three scores among the teams—the team with the lowest number of penalty points—receive the gold, silver, and bronze medals. However, a team must have at least three riders completing the competition, or else they will be eliminated. If a team has four riders complete, there is a drop-score in their results. If three riders complete, all three scores are added into the final total for the team.

Beginning in 2005, the European Eventing Championships was held in the short-format, without the phases A, B, and C (roads and tracks, and steeplechase) on speed and endurance day. It included just the dressage, cross-country, and show jumping phases.

The competition begins with a horse inspection to make sure all competing horses are sound before beginning the dressage. Then the nations nominate their four team riders and the order they wish them to compete, before the order of nations is determined. The order of go is especially important on cross country day, when the first competitors have the best footing, but do not know how the course will ride, while the later competitors will know the tricky obstacles on course, but may have to run their horses on torn up or sloppy footing.

Past winners
Britain's Ginny Elliot and Germany's Michael Jung are currently the only riders to have won the individual European Champion title three times in succession: Elliot became European Champion in 1985, 1987, and 1989; Jung became European Champion in 2011, 2013 and 2015.

On eight occasions, riders of a single nation have swept the podium, winning all three medals; Great Britain on 7 occasions, most recently in 2021 and Germany once in 2011.

Individual results

Team results

All-time medal table (1953–2021)

References

 
Eventing